Bosiljka Pušić (born May 2, 1936) is a Montenegrin writer and poet. Bosiljka was born in Ćuprija, Serbia. In early 1937 her family moved to Jagodina, where her father opened an independent watch-making shop and she stayed there until her high school graduation. Bosiljka acquired a degree in literature at the Faculty of Arts in University of Belgrade. Before retiring, she worked as a high school teacher in Herceg Novi, where she resides to the present day. She is also a painter. She is a mother of prominent musician Antonije Pušić, better known as Rambo Amadeus.
She has fan FB paige Bosiljka Pušic-Bašta of papira {@bosilikapusic}

Awards and nominations 
First place for the story Kavez (Prosvetni pregled, Belgrade, 1973).
Zmajeva počasna nagrada (2003).
"Živojin Pavlović" 2004 humoristic stories award for her book "Kako preživeti brak".
Second place for the story "Kralj koji je pojeo sam sebe" (Novi put, 2005).
Trilogy Naranče pod šlemom was nominated for "Miroslavljevo jevanđelje" in 2009.
Novel Knjiga o Vojinu was nominated for "Zlatno pero" award in 2009.

Publications

Children's books 
Hercegnovske čarolije (Osmjeh, Podgorica, 2000).
Koga boli uvo kako ja rastem (Osmjeh, Podgorica, 2000).
Ružičasti delfin (Bookland, Belgrade, 2001).
Žabilijada (Portal, Belgrade, 2003).
Doživljaji magarčića Magića (Portal, Belgrade, 2004).
Kobajagična putovanja (Bookland, Belgrade, 2006).
Plavojko (Bookland, Belgrade, 2000).
Ko te šiša ("Grigorije Dijak", Podgorica, 2010).
Kralj koji je pojeo i sebe (Bookland, Belgrade, 2012).

Poetry 
Krila iste ptice (1970).
Privid igre (1972).
Pelin u reveru (1976).
Rukom prema snu (1980).
Druga voda (1980).
Dobošari na trgu (1985).
Svođenje reči (1989).
Pepeo i krik (2000).

Story collections 
Kavez (1981).
Otapanje (1994).
Izlet u Žanjice (2000).

Novels 
Otvaranje lutke (1985).
Kako preživeti brak (2002, 2003).
Naranča i nož (2002).
Narančin cvat (2004).
Knjiga o Vojinu (2008).
Naranče pod šlemom - trilogija (2008).
Stimadur (2011).
Ispod žižule (2012).
Tondo (2013).
”Balada o Itane” (2016)
”Eva”(2017)
”Daleki akordi”(2020)

References

1936 births
Living people
20th-century novelists
21st-century novelists
20th-century women writers
21st-century women writers
20th-century short story writers
21st-century short story writers
Montenegrin poets
Montenegrin women children's writers
Montenegrin women short story writers
Women novelists
People from Ćuprija
Montenegrin painters
University of Belgrade alumni
Montenegrin educators